Glenbar may refer to:

 Glenbar, Queensland, a locality in the Fraser Coast Region, Queensland, Australia
 Glenbarr, a village in  Argyll and Bute, Scotland
 Glenbar, Arizona, United States, an unincorporated community